The West Nordic Council is a cooperation forum of the parliaments and governments of Greenland, the Faroe Islands, and Iceland. It was initially founded in 1985 as the West Nordic Parliamentarian Council of Cooperation but the name was changed in 1997. The council comprises six MPs from each nation appointed by their respective parliaments. The annual general meeting of the council rotates between the members and is its highest authority. The work and activities of the Council are organized by a three-member presidium of which the president of the council is a member. The August 2017 to September 2018 president was Kári P. Højgaard.

The nations of the Council share a somewhat common recent history: Greenland and the Faroes are autonomous territories of Denmark and Iceland is a former Danish possession. They also share a similar economic base, all being dependent on fisheries. The Council's main objectives are:
 To promote West Nordic (North Atlantic) interests.
 To be guardians of north Atlantic resources and North Atlantic culture and to help to promote West Nordic interests through the West Nordic governments – not least with regards to the serious issues of resource management, pollution, etc.
 To follow up on the governments' West Nordic cooperation.
 To work with the Nordic Council and to be the West Nordic link in Nordic cooperation.
 To act as the parliamentary link for inter-West Nordic organisations, including Arctic parliamentary cooperation.

The West Nordic Council is separate from the Nordic Council, although all of the members of the West Nordic Council are also members of the Nordic Council and there is some cooperation between the two.

General meetings 
This list is not complete
 31st general meeting: Runavík, Faroe Islands, August 2015; president Lars Emil Johansen
 30th general meeting: Vestmannaeyjar, Iceland, September 2014; president Bill Justinussen
 29th general meeting: Greenland; 2013; president Unnur Brá Konráðsdóttir
 28th general meeting: Faroe Islands; 2012; president Josef Motzfeldt
 27th general meeting: Bifröst University, August 2011; president: Kári P. Højgaard
 26th general meeting: Tasiilaq, August 2010; president: Ólína Þorvarðardóttir 2010–2011
 25th general meeting: Runavík and Tórshavn, August 2009; president: Josef Motzfeldt 2009–2010
 24th general meeting: Grundarfjörður, August 2008; president: Kári P. Højgaard 2008–2009
 23rd general meeting: Nuuk, August 2007; president: Karl V. Matthíasson 2007–2008
 22nd general meeting: Tórshavn, August 2006; president: Jonathan Motzfeldt 2006–2007
 21st general meeting: Ísafjörður, 2005; president: Henrik Old 2005–2006
 20th general meeting: Narsarsuaq, 2004; president: Birgir Ármannsson 2004–2005
 19th general meeting: Eiði, 2003; president: Jonathan Motzfeldt 2003–2004
 18th general meeting: Stykkishólmur, 2002; president: Jógvan á Lakjuni 2002–2003
 17th general meeting: Nuuk, 2001; president: Hjálmar Árnason 2001–2002
 16th general meeting: Tórshavn, 2000; president: Ole Lynge 2000–2001
 15th general meeting: Brjánsstaðir, Skeiðahreppur, 1999; president: Jógvan Durhuus 1999–2000
 14th general meeting: Ilulissat, 1998; president: Ísólfur Gylfi Pálmason 1998–1999
 13th general meeting: Øravík, 1997; president: Jonathan Motzfeldt 1997–1998
 12th general meeting: Vestmannaeyjar, 1996; president: Lisbeth L. Petersen 1996–1997
 11th general meeting: Qaqortoq, August 1995; president: Árni Johnsen 1995–1996
 1st general meeting: Nuuk, 1985; president: Jens K. Lyberth 1985–1986

Presidents 
Bryndís Haraldsdóttir 2016–present
Lars Emil Johansen 2015–2016
Bill Justinussen 2014–2015
Unnur Brá Konráðsdóttir 2013–2014
Josef Motzfeldt 2012–2013
Kári P. Højgaard 2011–2012
Ólína Þorvarðardóttir 2010–2011
Josef Motzfeldt 2009–2010
Henrik Old 2005–2006
Birgir Ármannsson 2004–2005
Jonathan Motzfeldt 2003–2004
Jógvan á Lakjuni 2002–2003
Hjálmar Árnason 2001–2002
Ole Lynge 2000–2001
Jógvan Durhuus 1999–2000
Ísólfur Gylfi Pálmason 1998–1999
Jonathan Motzfeldt 1994–1995
Lisbeth L. Petersen 1993–1994
Steingrímur J. Sigfússon 1992–1993
Jonathan Motzfeldt 1991–1992
Karin Kjølbro 1990–1991
Friðjón Þórðarson 1989–1990
Preben Lange 1988–1989
Hans Jacob Debes 1987–1988
Páll Pétursson 1986–1987

See also
Hoyvík Agreement - an Iceland-Faroes free trade agreement that might be expanded to Greenland creating a West Nordic free trade zone.
Arctic cooperation and politics

References

External links

1985 establishments in Greenland
International organizations based in the Americas
Nordic government
Nordic organizations
Organizations established in 1985
Politics of the Faroe Islands
Politics of Greenland
Politics of Iceland
Political organisations based in Greenland
Political organizations based in Iceland